The Kazakh women's national under 18 ice hockey team is the national under-18 ice hockey team in Kazakhstan. The team represents Kazakhstan at the International Ice Hockey Federation's IIHF World Women's U18 Division I - Qualifications.

World Women's U18 Championship record

*Includes one losses in extra time (in the round robin)
**Includes two losses in extra time (in the round robin)
^Includes one win in extra time (in the round robin)

Ice hockey
Women's national under-18 ice hockey teams